Dennis Hopson (born April 22, 1965) is an American basketball coach and former professional player who is the head coach of the Lourdes Gray Wolves men's basketball team. A prolific scorer while playing at Ohio State University, Hopson's stellar shooting skills placed him second for the NCAA Men's Basketball Division I scoring title during the 1986–87 season and eventually first on Ohio State's all-time men's basketball career points record.  The All-American and 1987 Big Ten Conference Player of the Year was selected as the third overall pick in the 1987 NBA Draft by the New Jersey Nets, playing a total of five seasons in the league.  Hopson spent the majority of the 1990s playing basketball overseas before retiring at the close of the decade.

College career
A six-foot five-inch (1.96 m) shooting guard and small forward, Dennis Hopson was a standout at Toledo's Bowsher High School before enrolling at Ohio State University.  He began his collegiate basketball career with the Ohio State Buckeyes on a quiet note, averaging 5.3 points per game as a freshman and 9.8 points per game during his sophomore campaign.  Hopson began to blossom during his junior year when he more than doubled his scoring average to 20.9 points per game. The star Buckeye swingman entered a new phase in his game when the school installed Gary Williams as their new head coach in 1986.  Williams implemented a quicker offensive tempo that complimented Hopson's preference for a running game, which subsequently allowed Hopson to further increase his production on offense. Hopson's gifted jump shot and extraordinary scoring abilities placed him as the second leading scorer in Division I during the 1986–87 season and earned him the 1987 Big Ten Player of the Year award.  He was also considered an all-around athlete as a senior: His point guard-like passing touch helped him record 3.6 assists per game (second best on the team)  and despite his size Hopson nonetheless lead the Buckeyes in rebounds, averaging 8.2 rebounds per game during his final season.  He completed his tenure at Ohio State with All-American honors and became the school's all-time leader in points and steals (Jay Burson would later break the school's steals record in 1989).

NBA career
Hopson was the third overall selection in the 1987 NBA Draft by the New Jersey Nets.  New Jersey's performance wilted earlier in the season when its formerly solid backcourt became plagued with injuries and contract disputes. Looking to re-establish a stable backcourt for the upcoming 1987–88 season, the Nets selected Dennis Hopson along with five other guards in the 1987 draft. Hopson was unable to live up to the organization's expectations after three seasons in New Jersey, even though he led the team in points in 1989–90. He also played briefly for the Chicago Bulls and the Sacramento Kings, winning a championship with the Bulls in 1990–91 even though he had very little playing time in either the 2nd half of the season or the playoffs. His last NBA game was in the 1991–92 season.

Overseas career
Hopson ventured overseas after departing from the NBA in 1992, stopping first in the Spanish Liga ACB before heading north to France two years later.  Hopson went from crossing countries to crossing continents when he joined the Philippine Basketball Association in 1996, though his stay in the league was cut short by an injury.   He resurfaced later in the year with the Turkish Basketball League's Galatasaray club roster for the 1996–97 season and departed mid-season.

He signed with the Hapoel Eilat basketball club of the Israeli Basketball Super League. The following season Hopson reunited with former college teammate Brad Sellers as members of Israel's Maccabi Rishon Lezion basketball club.  Hopson played well with LeZion that season and was considered one of the league's top players. The seasoned globetrotter was called up to briefly play for the Venezuelan Professional Basketball League's Gaiteros del Zulia club in 1999 and retired a year later, playing out the remainder of his professional career for Maccabi Giv'at Shmuel and Maccabi Kiryat Motzkin back in Israel.

Coaching career
Hopson retired from basketball in 2000 and returned to his home state to run a trucking and recruiting company in Columbus, Ohio.  However it wasn't long before Hopson returned to the game, assuming the duties as head coach of the ABA's Toledo Royal Knights until the team folded in December 2006.  Several years later he resettled in Florida to accept an assistant coaching position at Northwood University in West Palm Beach, Florida, where he served under head coach Rollie Massimino. In September 2009, he became an assistant basketball coach at Bowling Green State University.  He was let go when Louis Orr was not retained as head coach in 2014. In 2014, Hopson received the head coaching job at Bedford High School in Temperance, Michigan and resigned after one season. On May 2, 2019, Hopson was announced as the head coach of the Lourdes Gray Wolves men's basketball team.
Hopson then led the Grey Wolves to a conference tournament championship in the 2021–2022 season.

References

External links
College & NBA stats @ basketballreference.com
"For Hopson, hoops success takes backseat to degree" published April 16, 2006 @ toledoblade.com
NBA Draft Busts - No. 5

1965 births
Living people
20th-century African-American sportspeople
21st-century African-American people
African-American basketball players
All-American college men's basketball players
American Basketball Association (2000–present) coaches
American expatriate basketball people in France
American expatriate basketball people in Israel
American expatriate basketball people in the Philippines
American expatriate basketball people in Spain
American expatriate basketball people in Venezuela
American men's basketball coaches
American men's basketball players
Basketball players from Ohio
Bowling Green Falcons men's basketball coaches
CB Zaragoza players
Chicago Bulls players
Cholet Basket players
College men's basketball head coaches in the United States
Gaiteros del Zulia players
Galatasaray S.K. (men's basketball) players
Hapoel Eilat basketball players
High school basketball coaches in Michigan
Le Mans Sarthe Basket players
Liga ACB players
Maccabi Givat Shmuel players
Maccabi Kiryat Motzkin basketball players
Maccabi Rishon LeZion basketball players
Magnolia Hotshots players
New Jersey Nets draft picks
New Jersey Nets players
Ohio State Buckeyes men's basketball players
Philippine Basketball Association imports
Sacramento Kings players
Shooting guards
Small forwards
Sportspeople from Toledo, Ohio